Tom Schwarz (born 29 May 1994) is a German professional boxer who has held the IBF International heavyweight title since 2019, and previously held the WBO Inter-Continental heavyweight title from 2017 to 2019.

Professional career
Schwarz' first professional fight was on 29 August 2013 when he won a 20 second KO victory over 34 year old Mario Schmidt. After amassing a record of 12-0 (8 KO's), he accepted the challenge of fellow German contender Konstantin Airich and won via unanimous decision over eight rounds.

In his 15th professional fight on 15 November 2015, Schwarz faced the powerful 20-year-old German Ilja Mezencev for the vacant WBO Youth World Champion title. In the first round, Schwarz went down against Mezencev, but recovered to win by knockout in the seventh round and captured the WBO World Youth Title.

On 4 June 2016, Schwarz fought Dennis Lewandowski for the vacant WBC World Youth Title. This fight also represented his second title defense of the WBO World Youth Title. Schwarz clearly dominated the ten-round fight and won a unanimous decision.

On 22 April 2017, Schwarz beat 40-year-old Bosnian Adnan Redzovic (18-1-0) by knockout in the second round to win the vacant WBO Inter-Continental heavyweight title.

On 21 April 2018 Schwarz faced fellow unbeaten German Senad Gashi. In a highly controversial fight, Gashi had several head-butts that resulted in his disqualification in the sixth round of the fight. Up until the time of the stoppage, the fight had been competitive. In the same year, two knockout victories followed against the Mexican Julian Fernandez and fellow German Christian Lewandowski.

In March 2019, he defended his WBO Inter-Continental heavyweight title against Kristijan Krstacic of Croatia to record his 24th professional victory.

It was announced in March 2019 that Schwarz would take on the lineal and former unified world heavyweight champion Tyson Fury in a 12-round bout on 15 June 2019 in Las Vegas. The fight was a one-sided affair, with Schwarz outboxed by Fury, who switched to a southpaw stance after the first round. Shortly after dodging a series of punches from Schwarz, Fury knocked him to the canvas for the first time in his career with a straight right through his guard. Schwarz beat the count, but was stopped by the referee shortly afterwards, losing his WBO Inter-Continental title.

In his next fight, Schwarz faced Radel Varak. Schwarz attacked Varak from the start, and managed to drop him midway through the round. Varak would beat the count, but the referee decided he had seen enough and waved the fight off.

On 28 September 2019, Schwarz rematched Ilja Mezencev, winning convincingly via sixth round corner retirement and capturing the vacant IBF International title in the process.

Personal life 
In April 2021, it emerged that Schwarz was on trial for allegedly punching his former partner Tessa Schimschar in the face in a restaurant car park in Lostau, Germany, in May 2020. It is alleged that Schimschar was reportedly taken to a local hospital after receiving "a massive punch on the chin, which led to multiple fractures of the lower jaw", and that she subsequently filed a charge for grievous bodily harm.

Professional boxing record

Pay-per-view bouts

References

External links 

Tom Schwarz - Profile, News Archive & Current Rankings at Box.Live

German male boxers
World heavyweight boxing champions
World Boxing Organization champions
Heavyweight boxers
1994 births
Living people
Sportspeople from Halle (Saale)